The Ombalantu baobab tree, known also as a Tree of Life or Omukwa waaMbalantu, is a giant baobab tree of the species Adansonia digitata, situated in Outapi in the north of Namibia on the Main Road 123 from Tsandi.

The tree trunk has a door going into it and can accommodate about 35 people. It has served as a chapel, post office, house, and a hiding site during various stages of Namibian history.  the tree is a tourist attraction, known under the name "Ombalantu Baobab Tree Heritage Site". Since December 2004 the site features a display of its history and role in the Owambo community, as well as the history of the Namibian struggle for independence.

See also
 List of individual trees

References

Omusati Region
Flora of Namibia
Museums in Namibia
Tourist attractions in Namibia
Individual baobab trees
Individual trees in Namibia